The 1936 Cleveland Rams season was the team's only year with the American Football League and the first season in Cleveland. The team won its first of four franchise league championships.

Schedule

Championship
The AFL Championship Game was scratched and the Rams were awarded the Championship as the Boston Shamrocks were unable to field a team due to a players' strike after the Shamrocks failed to make payroll.

Despite this, the Shamrocks, who finished with the best regular season record, are credited as the league champs in various subsequent sources.

Standings

References

Cleveland Rams seasons
Cleveland Rams
Cleveland Rams